Dangerous Assignment is a 1950 British crime film directed by Ben R. Hart and starring Lionel Murton, Pamela Deeming and Ivan Craig. The film was a low-budget second feature, made with backing from the newly-formed distributor Apex Films. While it was criticised for its weak story, it received praise as a "commendable effort" which had achieved a certain amount of realism.

Synopsis
An American crime reporter tries to seek out the whereabouts of a missing car dealer.

Cast
 Lionel Murton as Joe Wilson  
 Pamela Deeming as Laura  
 Ivan Craig as Frank Mayer  
 MacDonald Parke as B.G. Bradley  
 Michael Hogarth
 Bill Hodge

References

Bibliography
 Chibnall, Steve & McFarlane, Brian. The British 'B' Film. Palgrave MacMillan, 2009.

External links

1950 films
British crime films
1950 crime films
Films shot in England
Films set in England
British black-and-white films
1950s English-language films
1950s British films